The 2014 FC Aktobe season was the 14th successive season that the club playing in the Kazakhstan Premier League, the highest tier of association football in Kazakhstan. Aktobe were the reigning Champions, having won the 2013 title, but failed to retain their crowning, finishing second behind Champions FC Astana . They reached the final of the Kazakhstan Cup and the Play-off Round of the Europa League before falling to Legia Warsaw.

Squad

Transfers

Winter

In:

Out:

Summer

In:

Out:

Competitions

Kazakhstan Super Cup

Kazakhstan Premier League

First round

Results summary

Results by round

Results

League table

Championship Round

Results summary

Results by round

Results

Table

Kazakhstan Cup

UEFA Champions League

Qualifying rounds

UEFA Europa League

Qualifying rounds

Squad statistics

Appearances and goals

|-
|colspan="14"|Players who appeared for Aktobe that left during the season:

|}

Goal scorers

Disciplinary record

References

FC Aktobe seasons
Aktobe
Akt